Albert Viljam Hagelin (24 April 1881 – 25 May 1946) was a Norwegian businessman and opera singer who became the Minister of Domestic Affairs in the Quisling regime, the puppet government headed by Vidkun Quisling during Germany's World War II occupation of Norway.

A native of Bergen, Hagelin was sentenced to death during the Norwegian post-war trials. He was executed by firing squad at Oslo's Akershus Fortress, where many of the 37 individuals condemned for treason and war crimes were executed.

References

External links

1881 births
1946 deaths
20th-century Norwegian businesspeople
Norwegian anti-communists
Members of Nasjonal Samling
Musicians from Bergen
Government ministers of Norway
Executed Norwegian collaborators with Nazi Germany
Executed politicians